Pawełki may refer to the following places:
Pawełki, Łomża County in Podlaskie Voivodeship (north-east Poland)
Pawełki, Sokółka County in Podlaskie Voivodeship (north-east Poland)
Pawełki, Silesian Voivodeship (south Poland)